Saint Helena, Ascension and Tristan da Cunha, a British Overseas Territory, does not have its own coat of arms; instead, the three administrative regions have their own symbols, respectively, as discussed in the following articles:

 Coat of arms of Saint Helena
 Coat of arms of Ascension Island
 Coat of arms of Tristan da Cunha
 Royal coat of arms of the United Kingdom, especially the version used by British government, is the only arms that has official status across the entire territory.

Saint Helena, Ascension and Tristan da Cunha
Saint Helena, Ascension and Tristan da Cunha culture